Sartakarat (also Romanized as Sartākarāt) is a village in Langarud Rural District, Salman Shahr District, Abbasabad County, Mazandaran Province, Iran. At the 2006 census, its population was 274, in 68 families.

References 

Populated places in Abbasabad County